Gibbsboro is a borough in Camden County, in the U.S. state of New Jersey. As of the 2020 United States census, the borough's population was 2,189, a decrease of 85 (−3.7%) from the 2010 census count of 2,274, which in turn reflected a decline of 161 (−6.6%) from the 2,435 counted in the 2000 census.

Gibbsboro was incorporated as a borough by an act of the New Jersey Legislature on March 8, 1924, from portions of Voorhees Township, based on the results of a referendum held on April 11, 1924. The borough was named for the Gibbs family, early settlers from 1706 for whom the area's post office was named when it was established in 1883.

Geography
According to the United States Census Bureau, the borough had a total area of 2.20 square miles (5.69 km2), including 2.15 square miles (5.57 km2) of land and 0.04 square miles (0.11 km2) of water (1.95%).

Gibbsboro borders Lindenwold and Voorhees Township.

Demographics

2010 census

The Census Bureau's 2006–2010 American Community Survey showed that (in 2010 inflation-adjusted dollars) median household income was $76,538 (with a margin of error of +/− $10,059) and the median family income was $86,481 (+/− $10,811). Males had a median income of $58,214 (+/− $13,396) versus $51,000 (+/− $12,885) for females. The per capita income for the borough was $33,258 (+/− $4,786). About 5.8% of families and 5.9% of the population were below the poverty line, including 12.0% of those under age 18 and 5.0% of those age 65 or over.

2000 census
As of the 2000 United States census there were 2,435 people, 829 households, and 664 families residing in the borough. The racial makeup of the borough was 94.00% White, 2.79% African American, 0.41% Native American, 1.07% Asian, 0.74% from other races, and 0.99% from two or more races. Hispanic or Latino of any race were 2.38% of the population.

There were 829 households, out of which 36.6% had children under the age of 18 living with them, 67.3% were married couples living together, 9.9% had a female householder with no husband present, and 19.8% were non-families. 16.6% of all households were made up of individuals, and 6.8% had someone living alone who was 65 years of age or older. The average household size was 2.91 and the average family size was 3.28.

In the borough the population was spread out, with 25.3% under the age of 18, 7.3% from 18 to 24, 27.9% from 25 to 44, 26.0% from 45 to 64, and 13.6% who were 65 years of age or older. The median age was 39 years. For every 100 females, there were 98.9 males. For every 100 females age 18 and over, there were 95.6 males.

The median income for a household in the borough was $57,326, and the median income for a family was $63,864. Males had a median income of $43,182 versus $30,807 for females. The per capita income for the borough was $26,035. About 2.4% of families and 4.2% of the population were below the poverty line, including 4.3% of those under age 18 and none of those age 65 or over.

Government

Local government
Gibbsboro is governed under the Borough form of New Jersey municipal government, the state's most common form of government, which is used by 218 municipalities (of the 564) statewide. The governing body is comprised of a Mayor and a Borough Council, with all positions elected at-large on a partisan basis as part of the November general election. A Mayor is elected directly by the voters to a four-year term of office. The Borough Council is comprised of six members elected to serve three-year terms on a staggered basis, with two seats coming up for election each year in a three-year cycle. The Borough form of government used by Gibbsboro is a "weak mayor / strong council" government in which council members act as the legislative body with the mayor presiding at meetings and voting only in the event of a tie. The mayor can veto ordinances subject to an override by a two-thirds majority vote of the council. The mayor makes committee and liaison assignments for council members, and most appointments are made by the mayor with the advice and consent of the council.

, the Mayor of Gibbsboro is Independent Edward G. Campbell III, whose term of office ends December 31, 2023. Members of the Gibbsboro Borough Council are Mitch Brown (I, 2022), Fred Deterding (I, 2023), Christine Karsch (I, 2023), Michael F. MacFerren (I, 2024), Ronald Rickert Jr. (I, 2022) and Glenn N. Werner (I, 2024).

Federal, state and county representation
Gibbsboro is located in the 1st Congressional District and is part of New Jersey's 6th state legislative district.

Politics
As of March 2011, there were a total of 1,678 registered voters in Gibbsboro, of which 651 (38.8%) were registered as Democrats, 347 (20.7%) were registered as Republicans and 680 (40.5%) were registered as Unaffiliated. There were no voters registered to other parties.

In the 2012 presidential election, Democrat Barack Obama received 57.2% of the vote (705 cast), ahead of Republican Mitt Romney with 41.9% (517 votes), and other candidates with 0.9% (11 votes), among the 1,236 ballots cast by the borough's 1,767 registered voters (3 ballots were spoiled), for a turnout of 69.9%. In the 2008 presidential election, Democrat Barack Obama received 54.6% of the vote (721 cast), ahead of Republican John McCain, who received around 42.6% (562 votes), with 1,320 ballots cast among the borough's 1,713 registered voters, for a turnout of 77.1%. In the 2004 presidential election, Democrat John Kerry received 52.9% of the vote (702 ballots cast), outpolling Republican George W. Bush, who received around 45.3% (601 votes), with 1,326 ballots cast among the borough's 1,694 registered voters, for a turnout percentage of 78.3.

In the 2013 gubernatorial election, Republican Chris Christie received 64.8% of the vote (458 cast), ahead of Democrat Barbara Buono with 34.1% (241 votes), and other candidates with 1.1% (8 votes), among the 719 ballots cast by the borough's 1,749 registered voters (12 ballots were spoiled), for a turnout of 41.1%. In the 2009 gubernatorial election, Republican Chris Christie received 47.9% of the vote (404 ballots cast), ahead of both Democrat Jon Corzine with 43.5% (367 votes) and Independent Chris Daggett with 6.4% (54 votes), with 843 ballots cast among the borough's 1,707 registered voters, yielding a 49.4% turnout.

Education
The Gibbsboro School District serves public school students in pre-kindergarten through eighth grade at Gibbsboro Public School. As of the 2018–19 school year, the district, comprised of one school, had an enrollment of 273 students and 26.4 classroom teachers (on an FTE basis), for a student–teacher ratio of 10.3:1.

Public school students in ninth through twelfth grades attend the Eastern Camden County Regional High School District, a limited-purpose, public regional school district that also serves the communities of Berlin Borough and Voorhees Township. As of the 2018–19 school year, the high school had an enrollment of 1,955 students and 140.0 classroom teachers (on an FTE basis), for a student–teacher ratio of 14.0:1. The district's board of education is  nine members who set policy and oversee the fiscal and educational operation of the district through its administration. Representation on the Board of Education is determined by the population of each of the three sending districts, with one seat allocated to Gibbsboro.

Transportation

No Interstate, U.S. or state highways traverse Gibbsboro. The main roadway serving the borough is County Route 561.

Notable people

People who were born in, residents of, or otherwise closely associated with Gibbsboro include:

 Zac Gallen (born 1995), pitcher for the Arizona Diamondbacks

References

External links

 Gibbsboro Borough municipal website
 Gibbsboro School District
 
 School Data for the Gibbsboro Public School, National Center for Education Statistics
 Eastern Camden County Regional High School District

 
1924 establishments in New Jersey
Borough form of New Jersey government
Boroughs in Camden County, New Jersey
Populated places established in 1924